Stories Round the Horseshoe Bend is a 2007 live album by American musician Steve Young. The album was recorded at Pioneer Pavilion in Youngstown, Ohio by Tom Sailor.

Track listing
"Ragtime Blue Guitar" 
"Little Birdie"
"Coal Tattoo" 
"White Trash Song"
"Tobacco Road"
"Seven Bridges Road" 
"Silverlake"
"Lonesome, On'ry & Mean"
"Ballad of William Sycamore"
"Peyote Chant"
"Coyote" 
"Useful Girl"
"One Woman Man"
"Hoboin'"
"Useful Girl"

References

2007 live albums
Steve Young (musician) albums